Foster Glacier is a glacier in the Royal Society Range, Antarctica,  south of Mount Kempe, flowing southeast into the Koettlitz Glacier. It was named by the Advisory Committee on Antarctic Names in 1963 for Major James Foster, United States Marine Corps, assistant air operations officer for U.S. Navy Task Force 43 in Antarctica, 1960.

Foster Crater is a nearby crater named in association with this glacier.

References 

Glaciers of Victoria Land
Scott Coast